The Melanesian Progressive Union (UPM) is a militant socialist pro-independence political party in New Caledonia. It is a component of the National Union for Independence, which in turn is one of the two components of the Kanak Socialist National Liberation Front (FLNKS).

History

The UPM was founded in 1974 by Melanesian supporters of the Caledonian Union who were opposed to the leader of the party, the white Maurice Lenormand. At first a Trotskyist political party close to the LCR in France, the party has since moderated to become a social democratic party.

Socialist parties in New Caledonia
Secessionist organizations
Melanesian socialism
Social democratic parties in France
Social democratic parties in Oceania